Grand Marais/Cook County Seaplane Base  is a county-owned, public-use seaplane base located seven miles (11 km) northwest of the central business district of Grand Marais, a city in Cook County, Minnesota, United States.

It is located on the shore of Devil's Track Lake and was formerly part of Devil's Track Municipal Airport (FAA: GRM). That airport had a runway which closed after the opening of Grand Marais/Cook County Airport (FAA: CKC), located one mile (1.6 km) to the north.

Facilities and aircraft 
It has two seaplane landing areas: 9/27 is 15,000 x 1,500 feet (4,572 x 457 m) and 3/21 is 3,000 x 2,000 feet (914 x 610 m). For the 12-month period ending August 31, 2003, the airport had 550 general aviation aircraft operations, an average of 46 per month.

See also 
 Grand Marais/Cook County Airport

References

External links 
Grand Marais Cook County Airport & Seaplane Base
 at Minnesota DOT Airport Directory

Airports in Minnesota
Seaplane bases in the United States
Buildings and structures in Cook County, Minnesota
Transportation in Cook County, Minnesota